Takachar is a limited company based in Boston as a spin-off from the Massachusetts Institute of Technology (MIT).  It is developing torrefaction reactors, which will cook agricultural waste to create biochar or biocoal – a modernised form of charcoal burning.  The target market is India, where traditional methods such as stubble burning create large amounts of smoke and have been a significant cause of air pollution.

The company was formed in 2018 by founders Vidyut Mohan and Kevin Kung. 

Takachar creates a sustainable bottom-up system that reduces pollution while supplying alternatives to fossil fuels, with the added benefit of creating a new revenue stream for farmers. By 2020, the company had converted 3,000 tons of biomass waste that would otherwise have been burned.

In 2021, the company won an Earthshot prize in the "Clean our Air" category, as its process and products are expected to reduce the amount of waste that is burnt in the open air.

References

Drying processes
Fuel production